The Congo Basin is the sedimentary basin of the Congo River. The Congo Basin is located in Central Africa, in a region known as west equatorial Africa. The Congo Basin region is sometimes known simply as the Congo. It contains some of the largest tropical rainforests in the world and is an important source of water used in agriculture and energy generation. 

The rainforest in the Congo Basin is the largest rainforest in Africa and second only to the Amazon rainforest in size, with 300 million hectares compared to the 800 million hectares in the Amazon. Because of its size and diversity, many experts have characterized the basin's forest as important for mitigating climate change because of its role as a carbon sink. However, deforestation and degradation of the ecology by the impacts of climate change may increase stress on the forest ecosystem, in turn making the hydrology of the basin more variable. A 2012 study found that the variability in precipitation caused by climate change will negatively affect economic activity in the basin.

Eight sites of the Congo Basin are inscribed on the World Heritage List, five being also on the list of World Heritage in Danger (all five located in Democratic Republic of the Congo). Fourteen percent of the humid forest is designated as protected.

Description 

Congo is a traditional name for the equatorial Middle Africa that lies between the Gulf of Guinea and the African Great Lakes. The basin begins in the highlands of the East African Rift system with input from the Chambeshi, the Uele and Ubangi rivers in the upper reaches and the Lualaba River draining wetlands in the middle reaches. Because of the young age and active uplift of the East African Rift at the headwaters, the river's yearly sediment load is very large, but the drainage basin occupies large areas of low relief throughout much of its area. It is delineated largely by swells including the Bie, Mayumbe, Adamlia, Nil-Congo, East African, and Zambian Swells.  

The basin ends where the river empties into the Gulf of Guinea on the Atlantic Ocean. The basin is a total of 3.7 million square kilometers and is home to some of the largest undisturbed stands of tropical rainforest on the planet, in addition to large wetlands.

Countries wholly or partially in the Congo region:
Angola
Gabon
Burundi
Cameroon
Central African Republic
Democratic Republic of the Congo
Republic of the Congo
Rwanda
Tanzania

Zambia

History 

The first inhabitants of the Congo Basin area were believed to be pygmies, and at that time, the dense forests and wet climate kept the population of the region low, with the prevention of hunter-gatherer society, whose remnants of their culture survive to the present day. Eventually Bantu peoples migrated there and founded the Kingdom of Kongo.

Belgium, France, and Portugal later established colonial control over the entire region by the late 19th century. The General Act of the Berlin Conference of 1885 gave a precise definition to the "conventional basin" of the Congo, which included the entire actual basin plus some other areas. The General Act bound its signatories to neutrality within the conventional basin, but this was not respected during the First World War.

The World Resources Institute estimated that 80 million people live in and around the Congo Basin.

Climate 
The climate is consistent, with two rainy seasons including very high rainfalls, and high temperature throughout the year.

The forests of the Congo Basin affect rainfall across the North Atlantic. In other words, these forests are crucial to the future of climate stability, a bulwark against runaway climate change.

Flora and fauna 
The Congo forest is home to the okapi, African forest elephant, pygmy hippopotamus, bongo (antelope), chimpanzee, bonobo and the Congo peafowl. The basin is home to the endangered western lowland gorilla. In 2010, the United Nations Environment Programme warned that gorillas could be extinct from the greater Congo Basin in a matter of 15 years.The Congo Basin is the largest forest in Africa. More than 10,000 plant species can be found in and around the forest. The humid forests cover 1.6 million km². The Congo Basin is an important source of African teak, used for building furniture and flooring. An estimated 40 million people depend on these woodlands, surviving on traditional livelihoods.

Ecology and protection 

At a global level, Congo's forests act as the planet's second lung, counterpart to the rapidly dwindling Amazon. They are a huge "carbon sink", trapping carbon that could otherwise remain carbon dioxide. The Congo Basin holds roughly 8% of the world's forest-based carbon. If these woodlands are deforested, the carbon they trap will be released into the atmosphere. Predictions for future unabated deforestation estimate that by 2050 activities in the DRC will release roughly the same amount of carbon dioxide as the United Kingdom has emitted over the last 60 years. A 2013 study by British scientists showed that deforestation in the Congo Basin rainforest was slowing down. In 2017, British scientists discovered that peatlands in the Cuvette Centrale, which cover a total of 145,500 sq km, contain 30 billion tonnes of carbon, or 20 years of U.S. fossil fuel emissions.

The Global Forest Atlas estimated that the logging industry covers from 44 to 66 million hectares of forest. A study published in 2019 in Nature Sustainability showed that 54,000 miles of roads for forest concessions were built between 2003 and 2018, reaching a total of 143,500 miles. A moratorium on logging in the Congo forest was agreed between the World Bank and the Democratic Republic of the Congo in May 2002. The World Bank agreed to provide $90 million of development aid to Democratic Republic of the Congo with the provision that the government did not issue any new concessions granting logging companies rights to exploit the forest. The deal also prohibited the renewal of existing concessions.

The government has written a new forestry code that requires companies to invest in local development and follow a sustainable, 25-year cycle of rotational logging. When a company is granted a concession from the central government to log in Congo, it must sign an agreement with the local chiefs and hereditary land owners, who give permission for it to extract the trees in return for development packages. In theory, the companies must pay the government nearly $18 million rent per year for these concessions, of which 40% should be returned to provincial governments for investment in social development of the local population in the logged areas.

In its current form, the Kyoto Protocol does not reward so-called "avoided deforestation"—initiatives that protect forest from being cut down. But many climate scientists and policymakers hope that negotiations for Kyoto's successor will include such measures. If this were the case, there could be a financial incentive for protecting forests. L’Île Mbiye, an island in the Lualaba River in Kisangani, is part of a project about forest ecosystem conservation, conducted by Stellenbosch University. Democratic Republic of the Congo is also looking to expand the area of forest under protection, for which it hopes to secure compensation through emerging markets for forest carbon. The main Congolese environmental organization working to save the forests is an NGO called OCEAN, which serves as the link between international outfits like Greenpeace and local community groups in the concessions.

National parks 

 Lobéké National Park
 Lomami National Park
 Nouabalé-Ndoki National Park
 Ntokou-Pikounda National Park
 Odzala-Kokoua National Park
 Salonga National Park
 Virunga National Park

References

External links

 Pygmies.org: African Pygmies website — first inhabitants of the Congo Basin rainforests.

 01
Congo River
Drainage basins of Africa
Sedimentary basins of Africa
Regions of Africa
Congolian forests
Landforms of Angola
Landforms of Cameroon
Geography of Central Africa
Landforms of Burundi
Landforms of Rwanda
Landforms of Tanzania
Landforms of the Central African Republic
Landforms of the Democratic Republic of the Congo
Landforms of the Republic of the Congo
Landforms of Zambia
Basins of Africa